The 1997 Jiffy Lube 300 was the 17th stock car race of the 1997 NASCAR Winston Cup Series and the fifth iteration of the event. The race was held on Sunday, July 13, 1997, in Loudon, New Hampshire, at New Hampshire International Speedway, a  permanent, oval-shaped, low-banked racetrack. The race took the scheduled 300 laps to complete. At race's end, Roush Racing driver Jeff Burton would manage to dominate the final third of the race to take his second career NASCAR Winston Cup Series victory and his second victory of the season. To fill out the top three, Richard Childress Racing driver Dale Earnhardt and Penske Racing South driver Rusty Wallace would finish second and third, respectively.

Background 

New Hampshire International Speedway is a 1.058-mile (1.703 km) oval speedway located in Loudon, New Hampshire which has hosted NASCAR racing annually since the early 1990s, as well as an IndyCar weekend and the oldest motorcycle race in North America, the Loudon Classic. Nicknamed "The Magic Mile", the speedway is often converted into a 1.6-mile (2.6 km) road course, which includes much of the oval. The track was originally the site of Bryar Motorsports Park before being purchased and redeveloped by Bob Bahre. The track is currently one of eight major NASCAR tracks owned and operated by Speedway Motorsports.

Entry list 

 (R) denotes rookie driver.

Qualifying 
Qualifying was split into two rounds. The first round was held on Friday, July 11. Each driver would have one lap to set a time. During the first round, the top 25 drivers in the round would be guaranteed a starting spot in the race. If a driver was not able to guarantee a spot in the first round, they had the option to scrub their time from the first round and try and run a faster lap time in a second round qualifying run, held on Saturday, July 12. As with the first round, each driver would have one lap to set a time. Positions 26-38 would be decided on time, and depending on who needed it, the 39th thru either the 42nd, 43rd, or 44th position would be based on provisionals. Four spots are awarded by the use of provisionals based on owner's points. The fifth is awarded to a past champion who has not otherwise qualified for the race. If no past champion needs the provisional, the field would be limited to 42 cars. If a champion needed it, the field would expand to 43 cars. If the race was a companion race with the NASCAR Winston West Series, four spots would be determined by NASCAR Winston Cup Series provisionals, while the final two spots would be given to teams in the Winston West Series, leaving the field at 44 cars.

Billy Standridge was the only driver to fail to qualify.

Full qualifying results

Race results

References 

1997 NASCAR Winston Cup Series
NASCAR races at New Hampshire Motor Speedway
July 1997 sports events in the United States
1997 in sports in New Hampshire